Jalan Pekan Sungkai (Perak state route A187) is a major road in Perak, Malaysia.

List of junctions

Slim